Mahla Zamani is an Iranian fashion designer, journalist and expert on Iranian traditional clothing.

Life 
She established the first fashion exhibition after the Iranian revolution (1979) and put significant effort in popularizing Iranian stylish clothing. In her view, Iranians need to revive their past and dress in elegant colorful and traditional styles (instead of black and Arabian dresses). Her efforts in advertising Persian, Qashqai, Kurdish, Turkmen and Baloch dress styles attracted international attention.

She has been attacked by fundamentalist circles and newspapers repeatedly.

In 2001 Zamani received permission to launch Lotus: A Persian Quarterly,  Iran's first fashion magazine and the first Iranian magazine to show the faces of women since the establishment of the Islamic Republic.

Zamani was asked to design a dress for Queen Saleha of Brunei as a gift from Iran.

References

External links 
Covered head to toe in silk and color

Iranian fashion designers
Iranian journalists
Fashion journalists
Year of birth missing (living people)
Living people
Iranian women journalists
Iranian women fashion designers
Muslim fashion designers